James Singleton may refer to:

 James K. Singleton (born 1939), American judge
 James Singleton (basketball) (born 1981), basketball player
 James Singleton (musician) (born 1955), American bassist and member of Astral Project
 Jim Singleton (born 1931), political activist
 James W. Singleton (1811–1892), Representative from Illinois